Eslamabad (also Romanized as Eslāmābād; also known as Sās) is a village in Zanus Rastaq Rural District, Kojur District, Nowshahr County, Mazandaran Province, Iran. At the 2006 census, its population was 274, in 101 families.

References 

Populated places in Nowshahr County